The Mixtape EP is the debut EP of the melodic death metal band Meridian Dawn. It was released on 25 March 2014. The mixtape features a guest appearance from Joacim "Jake E" Lundberg (Cyhra, ex-Amaranthe) on the track "Dressed In Ice". "Thieves" would be released as a lyric video single directed by Niklas Sundin (Dark Tranquillity, Cabin Fever Media).

Track listing

Personnel

Band members
 Antony Hämäläinen – vocals, lyrics
 Christopher Cussell – rhythm and lead guitar
 Brandon Johnson – rhythm guitar
 Nicholas Ziros – rhythm and lead guitar, bass
 Johan Nunez – drums

Additional personnel
 Joacim "Jake E" Lundberg – vocals on "Dressed in Ice"
 Gustavo Sazes – cover art, design

References

2014 mixtape albums
Meridian Dawn albums